Philemon is a given name. In the Bible, the Epistle to Philemon is addressed to Saint Philemon. Others so named include:

 Philemon (poet) (ca. 362 BC–ca. 262 BC), Athenian poet and playwright of the New Comedy
 Philemon the actor (died 305), a saint who was converted by Saint Appolonius; they were martyred together
 Philemon of Antioch, Greek Orthodox Patriarch from 1766 to 1767; see List of Greek Orthodox Patriarchs of Antioch
 Philemon Beecher (1776–1839), American attorney and member of the US House of Representatives from Ohio
 Philemon Bliss (1813–1889), member of the US House of Representatives from Ohio Congressman, first chief justice of the Supreme Court of Dakota Territory, and a Missouri Supreme Court justice
 Philemon Dickerson (1788–1862), member of the US House of Representatives, Governor of New Jersey and federal judge 
 Philemon Holland (1552–1637), English schoolmaster, physician, and translator
 Phil Masinga (1969–2019), full name Philemon Masinga, South African former footballer who played for teams in several countries
 Philemon Pownoll (ca. 1734–1780), Royal Navy officer
 Philemon Simpson (1819–1895), American politician and lawyer
 Philemon Thomas (1763–1847), member of the US House of Representatives from Louisiana
 Philemon Wright (1760–1839), farmer and entrepreneur in what is now Canada
 Philémon Yang (born 1947), Prime Minister of Cameroon from 2009 to 2019